.app is a short form of the word application often used in the IT sector. It may refer to:

 .app (gTLD), a top-level internet domain

Filename extension 
 Used in GEM
 Used in GNUstep
 Used in iOS
 Used to identify macOS application bundles
 Used in SkyOS
 Used in Symbian OS
 Used in Microsoft Windows (via AppWave)
 Used in HarmonyOS App Pack as a distributed app package with HAP files for AppGallery

See also 
 App (disambiguation)